Port Safaga, also known as Safaga, is a town in Egypt, on the coast of the Red Sea, located  south of Hurghada. This small port is also a tourist area that consists of several bungalows and rest houses, including the Safaga Hotel, with a capacity of 48 rooms (126 beds).

Having numerous phosphate mines, it is regarded as the phosphates export center. A paved road of  connects Safaga to Qena of Upper Egypt.

History 

The town was founded between 282 BC and 268 BC, by Satyrus. It was called Philotera in honor of the deceased sister of the Pharaoh Ptolemy II Philadelphus. Stephanus of Byzantium write that it was also called Philoterida.

Safaga City is considered one of the most important therapeutic tourist centres, as special medical researches have proved the potential of attracting international tourism to Safaga.

Safaga was a merchant port for many years. The town has a small tourism industry, specialising in scuba diving. It was the host of the 1993 Red Sea World Windsurfing Championships.

Climate 
Köppen-Geiger climate classification system classifies its climate as hot desert (BWh), as the rest of Egypt.

Port 
Safaga port is also a gateway for Duba port to some hajj pilgrims or travelers to Mecca, by ferries.

See also
 List of cities and towns in Egypt
Gamul Kebir

References 

Populated places in Red Sea Governorate
Populated coastal places in Egypt
Underwater diving sites in Egypt
Tourism in Egypt
Ancient Greeks in Egypt